David Alan "Riki" Rachtman (born June 15, 1962) is an American television and radio personality. He is best known for his association with the late 1980s and early-to-mid 1990s hard rock and heavy metal scene, hosting MTV's Headbangers Ball from 1990 to the show's cancellation in 1995, and he was the owner of the Hollywood-based nightclub The Cathouse.

Career

Rock scene
Riki Rachtman grew up in Van Nuys, California but later moved to the Hollywood Hills. At the age of 16, Rachtman auditioned to sing in the band the Angry Samoans, and the next year he was in a band called the Fairlanes. In the late 1980s, Rachtman was lead vocalist of the L.A. metal act Virgin. In the 1990s, he spent over a year in a band called Battery Club, which toured with The Offspring.

Rachtman appears in Attack of Life: The Bang Tango Movie, which is a 2016 documentary film directed by Drew Fortier about 80s LA hard rock band Bang Tango.

Hosting
Before becoming a full-time VJ for Headbangers Ball, Rachtman made guest appearances as a fill-in and guest VJ for the show in 1989 while Adam Curry was still the main host for the program at that time. From 1990–1995, Rachtman hosted MTV's heavy metal show Headbangers Ball (replacing Curry) as a full-time VJ. His friend at the time, Axl Rose of Guns N' Roses, reportedly was instrumental in him getting the job at MTV. Despite having no TV experience during that time, he eventually got a job as a VJ on MTV after his successful performance during his audition at MTV studios in New York. Rachtman had a brief appearance as a wedding guest in Guns N' Roses' music video "November Rain".

From August 1993 to January 1996, Riki co-hosted the radio advice program Loveline with Doctor Drew Pinsky, before being joined by Adam Carolla in October 1995. The trio hosted together until Rachtman decided to leave and pursue other ventures in January 1996.

In 1999 and 2000, Rachtman worked for World Championship Wrestling as a backstage interviewer. During one episode, he was almost powerbombed by wrestler Kevin Nash. He also hosted Nitro, WCW's flagship program, parties across the country. Rachtman had previously appeared on WCW programming as a guest co-host for the May 30, 1992 edition of Saturday Night.

On the Los Angeles radio station KLSX, Rachtman hosted a show called 'Riki Rachtman Radio.' The show came to an abrupt end when he assaulted fellow KLSX show host Doug Steckler after Steckler insulted Rachtman's girlfriend at the time, adult-film actress Janine Lindemulder.

In 2003, Rachtman hosted 22 Greatest Bands for MTV2.

In 2003, he became the host of a syndicated rock music and NASCAR-themed radio show called Racing Rocks, which is heard on over 120 stations across America. He hosted Nascar 24/7 Live. He was a former co-host of the show NASCAR RaceDay, as of 2008 is no longer part of the program.

Starting 2020 Riki Rachtman became a part of the American Flat Track motorcycle racing series as an on air personality and hype man at all the live events

Entrepreneurship
Rachtman was the owner of The Cathouse nightclub, for many years a showcase for many of the heavy metal bands that were featured on Headbangers Ball. During this time, he also ran another nightclub called the Bordello. Rachtman and the Cathouse club are featured in the Penelope Spheeris documentary, The Decline of Western Civilization Part II: The Metal Years. During their heyday, they were also featured in Rolling Stone and Newsweek magazines.

Rachtman also owns a skateboard company called Pool School.

In the Summer of 2015, Rachtman became an ordained minister and performed his first marriage ceremony on August 15, 2015 at the Cathouse Live Concert at Irvine Meadows officiating the ceremony of Skye Hazard and Sean Kelehan of Omaha, Nebraska.

In 2019 Riki Rachtman opened up Cathouse HQ IN Mooresville NC Expanding the brand CATHOUSE to an apparel line currently available on www.cathousehollywood.com

In May of 2022 Riki Rachtman launched a limited release of CATHOUSE COFFEE. He posted on social media that it was not a licensing deal  and he was very involved every step of the way. The initial release of a medium roast and a dark roast sold out in a few hours

VH1
Rachtman Co-hosted the 2007 reunion show for Rock of Love, which starred his friend, Poison frontman Bret Michaels. Rachtman was also a dean on Rock of Love: Charm School, which featured Sharon Osbourne as headmistress and contestants from Rock of Love seasons 1 and 2, and he also hosted its reunion special, as well. In 2008, he hosted the reunion special for Rock of Love 2. In 2009, he again hosted the reunion special for Rock of Love Bus. He was last seen on Daisy of Love, a Rock of Love spin-off starring Daisy De La Hoya, Rachtman's friend and Rock of Love 2 runner-up.

Personal life
By 1999, he had lived in Orange County, California. In 1994, Riki told Chris Cornell on a Soundgarden episode of The Headbanger's Ball that he used to live in New Zealand.

In 1991 Riki Rachtman was picked by Bam Magazine as one of the fifty most influential people in music.

Riki Rachtman has ridden a motorcycle coast to coast over a dozen times,Mexico to Canada twice and 2018 he passed through 48 states riding alone.

In 2018, Rachtman tweeted that he had been drug and alcohol free for 30 years.

Rachtman once dated and lived with adult actress Janine Lindemulder.

In November 2014, he announced on his Facebook account that he would be moving to Charlotte, North Carolina.

Every year Rachtman raises money and goes on a motorcycle ride throughout North America. It is called Riki's Ride, and so far has raised close to $50,000 for various charities. On Dec. 6, 2020, during a live web broadcast from Indian Motorcycle of Charlotte, Rachtman announced that 2020 was his last Riki's Ride and presented a check for more than $22,000 to Ryan Blaney for the Ryan Blaney Family Foundation. 

On December 12, 2021, Rachtman married Lea Vendetta from the television show Inkmaster. Together they live in Mooresville, North Carolina.

Notes

External links
 
Racing Rocks with Riki Rachtman
lovelinecentral.com

Living people
American radio personalities
Professional wrestling announcers
VJs (media personalities)
People from Van Nuys, Los Angeles
People from Orange County, California
1965 births